Salvatore Tazza (born 18 January 1998) is an Italian football player. He plays for  club Vibonese.

Club career
He made his Serie C debut for Reggina on 7 November 2017 in a game against Siracusa.

On 23 July 2019, he was loaned to Arzignano.

On 17 September 2020 he moved to Cavese on a permanent basis on a 1-year contract with extension option.

On 13 January 2021 he joined Bisceglie.

On 6 November 2021 he signed with Team Altamura in Serie D.

References

External links
 

1998 births
Footballers from Naples
Living people
Italian footballers
Association football defenders
Benevento Calcio players
Reggina 1914 players
Paganese Calcio 1926 players
Cavese 1919 players
A.S. Bisceglie Calcio 1913 players
U.S. Vibonese Calcio players
Serie C players
Serie D players